, which stands for "Soft Development Innovation Multi Success", is a Japanese video game publisher and developer originally established on June 12, 1991 as a joint venture of Sanritsu Denki Co., Ltd. and Sega Enterprises, Ltd. About 50 employees transferred over from Sanritsu.

SIMS became independent of the Sega group on June 25, 2004, when Representative Director Noboru Machida took over all stock from the veteran game maker

Games

Nintendo 3DS
Fish On
Beyblade: Evolution

PlayStation Vita
Let's Fish! Hooked On

Dreamcast
Charge 'N Blast
The House of the Dead 2
Sega Bass Fishing

Master System
Buggy Run
Disney's Aladdin
Masters of Combat
Ninja Gaiden
Master of Darkness

Mega Drive / Genesis
ATP Tour Championship Tennis
Devil Buster (unreleased)
From TV Animation Slam Dunk: Kyougou Makkou Taiketsu!
Mighty Morphin' Power Rangers: The Movie
Out Run 2019
Shadow Dancer
Scratch Golf (unreleased)
Wimbledon II (unreleased)

Sega CD
Vay
Popful Mail: Magical Fantasy Adventure (Translation)

Game Gear
Mighty Morphin' Power Rangers
Disney's Aladdin
Buster Fight
Fred Couples Golf
Master of Darkness
Tails' Skypatrol

Wii
Hooked! Real Motion Fishing
Sega Bass Fishing (co-developed with Cavia)
Reel Fishing: Angler's Dream
Hooked! Again: Real Motion Fishing
All Round Hunter

WiiWare
Derby Dogs
Reel Fishing Challenge

PSP
 Ape Escape: On the Loose

Multi-platform
 Mark Davis Pro Bass Challenge (PS2, GameCube)
 Legendary Fishing (PS4, Switch)

See also
List of Sanritsu/SIMS games

References

External links
 

Software companies based in Tokyo
Video game companies established in 1991
Joint ventures
Sega divisions and subsidiaries
Video game companies of Japan
Video game development companies
Video game publishers
Japanese companies established in 1991